Maurice "Moe" Anthony Sherrod Williams (born November 7, 1987) is an American football wide receiver for the Jacksonville Sharks of the National Arena League (NAL).

Early years
Born the son of Monica Jones, Maurice was one of the most highly touted recruits coming out of Pennsylvania in the 2007 Recruiting Class. Maurice was a Four Star recruit by Scout.com and was ranked as high as the #13 WR in the Nation, even though he was a Quarterback at Erie, PA Strong Vincent High School where he was a Class AAA All-State Defensive Back and an All-Region QB for the Colonels. He earned Local, Regional, and National attention, being named to the SuperPrep All-American Team, and was selected to play in the Pennsylvania Football Coaches Association East-West All-Star Game. He was among those selected in the ESPN150 and Scout Hot 100. Lettered all four years in Football, Basketball, and Track & Field while at Strong Vincent.

College career
Picked to attend the University of Pittsburgh over West Virginia and Iowa for the 2007 NCAA Football Season to play for the Panthers. Williams played one season for the Panthers as a True Freshman. After being Panthers top Wide Receiver in three spring scrimmages and the Annual Blue-Gold Game, Williams was declared Academically Ineligible. Early reports said Williams was set to take a Red-Shirt year, but he transferred to Edinboro University of Pennsylvania. He never became eligible to play at Edinboro.

Professional career

Canton Cougars
On March 24, 2011, almost four years since Williams last played organized football, Maurice signed with the Canton Cougars of the Ultimate Indoor Football League (UIFL). In seven games for the Cougars, Williams scored 17 Touchdowns on 34 Receptions.

Cleveland Gladiators
On October 28, 2011, Williams signed with the Cleveland Gladiators of the Arena Football League (AFL) for the 2012 season. Maurice earned the Week 16 Spalding Highlight of the Week for his 53-yard kick return touchdown versus the Jacksonville Sharks.

Orlando Predators
On May 5, 2013, Williams was acquired by the Orlando Predators after spending the earlier part of the season with the Cleveland Gladiators. On his first two touches as a Predator, Williams scored on a 56-yard kick return and a 41-yard reception.

Indianapolis Colts
On August 20, 2013, Williams signed with the Indianapolis Colts. On August 25, Williams was waived by the Colts with an injury settlement.

Los Angeles Kiss
On May 8, 2014, Williams was assigned to the Los Angeles Kiss. He scored three touchdowns in his first start with the Kiss.

Jacksonville Sharks
On June 2, 2014, Williams was traded to the Jacksonville Sharks

Las Vegas Outlaws
On December 22, 2014, Williams was selected by the Las Vegas Outlaws in the 2014 Expansion Draft.

Return to Erie
On April 15, 2015, Williams signed with the Erie Explosion, who had moved to the Professional Indoor Football League.

Portland Thunder
On May 19, 2015, Williams was assigned to the Portland Thunder. On December 4, 2015, Williams was placed on league suspension.

Jacksonville Sharks
On February 6, 2017, Williams signed with the Jacksonville Sharks, who had moved to the National Arena League.

References

External links 
Pitt Panthers bio

1987 births
Living people
American football wide receivers
Pittsburgh Panthers football players
Canton Cougars players
Erie Explosion players
Cleveland Gladiators players
Orlando Predators players
Los Angeles Kiss players
Jacksonville Sharks players
Las Vegas Outlaws (arena football) players
Portland Thunder players
Portland Steel players